Daisuke Hanahara (born 11 December 1969) is a Japanese wrestler. He competed in the men's Greco-Roman 57 kg at the 1992 Summer Olympics.

References

1969 births
Living people
Japanese male sport wrestlers
Olympic wrestlers of Japan
Wrestlers at the 1992 Summer Olympics
Sportspeople from Tokyo
Asian Wrestling Championships medalists